The 2020–21 Howard Bison men's basketball team represented Howard University in the 2020–21 NCAA Division I men's basketball season. The Bison, led by second-year head coach Kenny Blakeney, played their home games at Burr Gymnasium in Washington, D.C. as members of the Mid-Eastern Athletic Conference. With the creation of divisions to cut down on travel due to the COVID-19 pandemic, they will play in the Northern Division. They finished the season 1–4, 0–0 in MEAC play before suspending their season on February 9, 2021 due to an abundance of positive cases amongst their players amid the COVID-19 pandemic.

Previous season
The Bison finished the 2019–20 season 4–29, 1–15 in MEAC play to finish in last place. They defeated South Carolina State in the first round of the MEAC tournament, before losing to North Carolina A&T in the quarterfinals.

Roster

Schedule and results 

|-
!colspan=12 style=| Regular season

|-
!colspan=12 style=| MEAC tournament
|-

|-

Source

References

Howard Bison men's basketball seasons
Howard Bison
Howard Bison men's basketball
Howard Bison men's basketball
Howard Bison